Fritelli (singular Fritellu), also Fritelle (singular Fritella) are Corsican doughnuts or fritters made from fried wheat  or chestnut flour (Fritelle castagnine). A preparation of the fritters is referred to as Fritelli di Casgiu Frescu with fresh cheese (or Brocciu) or Fritelli di Salciccia with sausage.

According to an 1880 Scribners monthly account, the chestnuts were collected from those that had fallen (and beating the trees to knock them down was discouraged). The nuts were then taken to huts and placed six-inches deep in trays where they were slow cooked with green wood fires until hard and dry. In this state they could be kept for years and were milled into flour "like corn or wheat", which was then made into fritelli or other dishes such as "pulenta" (polenta), necci, pattoni, castagnacciu, and cialdi.

See also
List of fried dough
List of doughnut varieties
Bambalouni

References

Sources

Doughnuts
Corsican cuisine
Corsican desserts
Chestnut dishes